Ibrahim Mahama may refer to:
 Ibrahim Mahama (artist) (born 1987), Ghanaian artist
 Ibrahim Mahama (businessman) (born 1971), Ghanaian businessman

See also 
 Ibrahim Mahama Atiku (born 1986), Ghanaian footballer
 Ibrahim Makama Misau, Nigerian politician